is a village located in Kamo District, Gifu Prefecture, Japan. , the village had an estimated population of 2,278 and a population density of 26 persons per km2, in 842 households. Higashishirakawa has been selected as one of The Most Beautiful Villages in Japan.

Geography
Higashishirakawa is located in the Mino-Mikawa Plateau of central Gifu Prefecture, surrounded by 1000-meter class mountains. Over 90% of the village area is forested.  The town village has a climate characterized by hot and humid summers, and mild winters  (Köppen climate classification Cfa).  The average annual temperature in Higashishirakawa is 12.7 °C. The average annual rainfall is 2038 mm with September as the wettest month. The temperatures are highest on average in August, at around 25.4 °C, and lowest in January, at around 0.4 °C.

Neighbouring municipalities
Gifu Prefecture
Nakatsugawa
Shirakawa

Demographics
Per Japanese census data, the population of Higashishirakawa has declined steadily over the past 50 years.

History
The area around Higashishirakawa was part of traditional Mino Province.  During the Edo period, it was part of the territory controlled by Naegi Domain. During the post-Meiji restoration cadastral reforms, the area was organised into Kamo District, Gifu Prefecture. The village of Higashishirawa was formed on July 1, 1889 with the establishment of the modern municipalities system. The early Meiji period Haibutsu kishaku movement was especially strong in this area, and to this day, Higashishirakawa is the only municipality in Japan without a single Buddhist temple. Plans to merge the village with the neighbouring city of Gifu were rejected by a referendum in June 2004.

Economy
The mainstay of the local economy is agriculture and forestry.

Education
Higashishirakawa has one public elementary school and one public middle school operated by the village government. The village does not have a high school.

Transportation

Railway
The village does not have any passenger train service.

Highway

References

External links

 

 
Villages in Gifu Prefecture